The 1952 Texas gubernatorial election was held on November 4, 1952.

Incumbent Democratic Governor Allan Shivers was overwhelmingly reelected in the general election after defeating future Senator Ralph Yarborough in the Democratic primary. The Republican Party endorsed the Democratic state ticket, including Shivers, in order to attract more votes for their presidential nominee, General Dwight Eisenhower.

Primary elections
Primary elections were held on July 26, 1952.

Democratic primary

Candidates
Allan Shivers, incumbent Governor
Allene M. Traylor, housewife
Ralph W. Yarborough, attorney

Results

General election

Candidates
Shivers endorsed the Republican nominee for President, Dwight D. Eisenhower, in the concurrent presidential election. In an attempt to maximise support for Eisenhower, the state Republican Party nominated the Democratic state ticket, allowing voters to cast a straight G.O.P. ballot without voting against down-ballot Democratic candidates.

Results

References

Bibliography
 
 

1952
Texas
Gubernatorial
November 1952 events in the United States